Clémence d'Aquitaine (1048, Poitiers, France – 4 January 1130) was the daughter of William VII, Duke of Aquitaine and Ermensinde de Longwy.

Biography 
Around 1075 she married Conrad I, Count of Luxembourg and together they had:

 Matilda; married Godefrey, Count of Bliesgau.
 Henry III, Count of Luxembourg (1096†)
 Rudolph (1099†); abbot of Saint-Vannes at Verdun.
 Conrad
 Adalbero (1098†); Archdeacon of Metz, was traveling to Jerusalem as part of the army of Godfrey of Bouillon, when he was executed by the Turks.
 Ermesinde (1080-1143); married Albert II, count of Egisheim and of Dagsbourg; after his passing she married Godfrey I, Count of Namur.
 William I (1081-1131); Count of Luxembourg.
After Conrad's death in 1086, she later married Gerard I, Count of Guelders and together they had at least two daughters:

 Jutta (1093- 23 Jan 1151); married Waleran II, Count of Limburg.
 Yolande/Jolande; married Baldwin III, Count of Hainaut.

References

1048 births
1130 deaths
11th-century French women
11th-century French people
12th-century French women
12th-century French people
Countesses of Luxembourg